Harold Henry Joachim, FBA (28 May 1868 – 30 July 1938) was a British idealist philosopher. A disciple of Francis Herbert Bradley, whose posthumous papers he edited, Joachim is now identified with the later days of the British idealist movement. He is generally credited with the definitive formulation of the coherence theory of truth, in his book The Nature of Truth (1906). He was also a scholar of Aristotle and Spinoza.

Life
Harold Henry Joachim was born in London, the son of a wool merchant who had come to England as a young man from Hungary. He was educated at Harrow School and Balliol College, Oxford, where he was a pupil of R. L. Nettleship. He was elected to a Prize Fellowship at Merton College in 1890, and in 1892 became a philosophy lecturer at the University of St Andrews. Returning to Oxford in 1894, he was lecturer at Balliol until becoming a Fellow and Tutor at Merton in 1897. In 1907 he married his first cousin, a daughter of the violinist Joseph Joachim. He became Wykeham Professor of Logic of the University of Oxford from 1919, succeeding the realist John Cook Wilson, and occupied the chair until his death. Whilst at Oxford he taught the American poet T.S. Eliot. Joachim was a nephew of the great 19th Century violinist Joseph Joachim, and was himself a talented amateur violinist.

Legacy
The coherence theory is nowadays viewed as part of a class of theories called robust or inflationary accounts of truth. In this class, it is a rival to the correspondence and the pragmatist theories. Both Bertrand Russell, arguing for the former, and William James, arguing for the latter, cited Joachim's text as a paradigm of what they thought was wrong about the coherence theory.

Works 
 Study of the Ethics of Spinoza (Ethica Ordine Geometrico Demonstrata) (1901)
 The Nature of Truth (1906)
 Aristotle's De lineis insecabilibus (1908) translator
 The Platonic Distinction Between 'True' and 'False' Pleasures and Pains article in Philosophical Review September 1911, Volume XX, pages 471 to 497
 Immediate Experience and Mediation (1919)
 Aristotle on Coming-To-Be & Passing-Away (De Generatione et Corruptione) (1922; reprinted 1999)
 Logical Studies (1948)
 Aristotle: The Nicomachean Ethics: A Commentary, edited by D A Rees (1951)
 Descartes's Rules for the Direction of the Mind (1957) edited from notes by John Austin and Errol Harris

He was probably involved, if uncredited, in the editing of Bradley's collected works, including the Collected Essays with Bradley's sister Marian de Glehn, and Ethical Studies.

References

External links 

 
 
 Coherence Theory of Truth by Harold H. Joachim, excerpts from The Nature of Truth and related comments in a document on the website of the philosophy department of Lander University
 
 Harold Henry Joachim (1868-1938) by Nicholas Griffin, in The Internet Encyclopedia of Philosophy, article first published 3 May 2008

1868 births
1938 deaths
British philosophers
Wykeham Professors of Logic
Alumni of Balliol College, Oxford
Fellows of Merton College, Oxford
Idealists
People educated at Harrow School
Spinoza scholars